Colonel Robert Berkeley Airey,  (21 September 1874 – 23 June 1933) was an English cricketer and British Army officer. He was a right-handed batsman who played first-class cricket for Hampshire during the 1911 season. He was born in Southminster and died in Westminster Pier.

Airey played just three matches for the Hampshire first-team, scoring 30 runs in his debut first-class innings, his single best score in any first-class match. He played in the return fixture just two weeks later, but failed to make much of an impact with the bat, scoring a duck in his first innings.

His final first-class game, at the end of the month, saw him dismissed for a duck in the one and only innings in which he played.

Airey attended the Royal Military College, Sandhurst and joined the South Wales Borderers as a second-lieutenant on 6 March 1895. After promotion to lieutenant, he transferred to the Army Service Corps in 1899, and was promoted to captain on 1 January 1901. He saw active service in the Second Boer War in South Africa, from which he returned in September 1902. He was seconded for service with the Egyptian Army in November 1902, and stayed there until 1907.

For his service in the First World War, he was invested as a Companion of the Order of St Michael and St George (CMG) (for operations in France and Flanders) (1918) and earning the Distinguished Service Order (DSO) (1916).

References

External links
Robert Airey at Cricket Archive

1874 births
1933 deaths
English cricketers
Hampshire cricketers
People from Maldon District
Companions of the Order of St Michael and St George
Companions of the Distinguished Service Order
British Army personnel of World War I
South Wales Borderers officers
Royal Army Service Corps officers
British Army personnel of the Second Boer War